Archibald "Archie" Andrews, created in 1941 by publisher John L. Goldwater and artist Bob Montana in collaboration with writer Vic Bloom, is the main character in the Archie Comics franchise, including the long-running Archie Andrews radio series, a syndicated comic strip, The Archie Show, Archie's Weird Mysteries, and Riverdale. He is the rhythm guitarist and one of the three singers of the fictional band The Archies. He is portrayed by KJ Apa on Riverdale.
For his physical appearance, he mainly has red hair, freckles on his cheeks, and light-colored skin. In Archie's Weird Mysteries, he appears to be of Scottish-American descent, as shown in the episode "The Day the Earth Moved", when his father wanted to keep with their family tradition and wear a kilt while ringing the bell of Riverdale.

Fictional character biography
Archie Andrews debuted in Pep Comics 22 (cover-dated Dec. 1941). He is the only child of Mary and Fred Andrews. His father works as a mid-level business executive. His mother, initially a homemaker, takes a job at a real estate agency in later years. His earlier life is revealed in the "Little Archie" stories when he had a dog named Spotty. Archie lives in Riverdale, where he attends Riverdale High School.

Archie is a typical small-town teenager. His main crush is Veronica Lodge, but he is also fond of Betty Cooper, forming the love triangle driving many of the comic's plot lines. He has the best intentions, but often comes into conflict with Veronica's rich father, Hiram Lodge, and Riverdale High's principal, Waldo Weatherbee. As one of the three vocalists and the rhythm guitarist of The Archies, Archie performs with Betty and Veronica, as well as his friend Reggie Mantle, who battles him for Veronica's heart, and his best friend Jughead Jones.

Mary and Fred Andrews are of Scottish descent. Archie's paternal grandfather, Andy Andrews, immigrated to the United States from Scotland and befriended Moose Mason's Russian ancestor, who had emigrated at the same time. Archie has been depicted wearing the traditional kilt of his ancestors and playing bagpipes (but not very well).

The Little Archie series, published from 1956 through the mid-1990s, chronicles the adventures of pre-teen Archie and his friends while in elementary school.

The 2010 revival of the Life with Archie series chronicles two alternate, parallel story lines, with Archie marrying Veronica in one and Betty the other.

He has orange hair, a face with a set of three freckles on each cheek, and light skin.

Relationships

Love life
Archie and Betty have been best friends and love interests all their lives. When Veronica Lodge moved to Riverdale, however, he switched his attention to her, making Betty both angry and jealous. She began competing with Veronica for his affection.

In the comics, he sometimes thinks of Betty more as a close friend and confidante. He likes that she is always available as a back-up when he does not have a date with Veronica.

He dislikes it when Betty dates other boys, wanting her to stay available as his second choice. Now that Betty sporadically dates Jason Blossom and Adam Chisholm, Archie shows a tinge of jealousy. Archie is married to Betty in Archie Marries Betty: Life With Archie series and is married to Veronica in Archie Marries Veronica: Life with Archie series. Both scenarios produce different outcomes for Archie's overall life, as well as Betty's and Veronica's.

Archie often competes for the attention of Betty and Veronica with his rival, Reggie Mantle, and occasionally other boys. Veronica keeps Archie guessing, never letting him take her for granted. Betty, on the other hand, clearly lets Archie know she adores him. Archie chooses to keep fighting for Veronica.

A third love interest is a wealthy red-headed girl named Cheryl Blossom. At first, she was deemed too sexual and a bit promiscuous and was taken out of the series, but due to her popularity, she was brought back in Love Showdown, a four-part mini-series in which Archie attempts to make a decision between Cheryl, Betty, and Veronica.

On May 15, 2009, Archie Comics announced that Archie would finally pick one of the girls to marry, in a story arc in Archie #600–606 (Aug. 2009 – Feb. 2010). However, Archie Comics publicly revealed this to be a dream sequence to show two possible futures: one where Archie marries Veronica (issues 600–602), and the other Betty (603–605). In both, he has twins: a boy also named Archie who looks like him, and a girl named after and resembling whichever girl he married. Issue 606 was an epilogue to Archie Marries Veronica/Archie Marries Betty that returns to the comics' old format.

In Archie No. 608 (May 2010), Archie began a relationship with Valerie Brown, making her Archie's first girlfriend of African descent. The Archies and Josie and the Pussycats were touring together and, while rehearsing, Archie and Valerie secretly fell in love as they co-wrote the song "More Than Words" that described their feelings. Issue No. 609 revealed that this relationship had seeped into common knowledge by the end of the tour. Archie and Valerie were forced apart when the Pussycats were touring Europe without the Archies, but hoped to keep their relationship going. In the comic Archie Marries Valerie, Valerie is expecting a baby with Archie, whom they name Star.

In Archie No. 700 (July 2019), which signifies the start of another soft reboot, it is revealed that Archie got into a relationship with Sabrina Spellman over his summer break while everyone was on vacation after she had saved him from a pack of wolves.

Friends

Jughead Jones has been Archie's best friend ever since childhood. When Jughead first came to Riverdale, he was in a bad mood and tended to dismiss Archie. However, Archie, of good heart, tried to cheer up Jughead and the two have been inseparable ever since. Jughead wears a trademark clubhouse beanie (a Depression-era style of makeshift hatwear, crafted from an inverted fedora with a scallop-cut brim, and decorated with assorted pinbacks) and an inscrutable, closed-eyelid expression.  Often Jughead has to help Archie out from a tricky situation. Jughead usually knows when Archie's ideas will not work, but is powerless to avoid getting involved.

Reggie Mantle is Archie's constant romantic and athletic rival. Each often makes attempts to separate the other from Veronica, occasionally exhibiting physical violence, and both have won their fair share of scrapes with each other. Reggie takes every opportunity to play practical jokes on Archie and make cynical wisecracks. However, Reggie is often shown as a companion to and of Archie despite his arrogance and competitive nature, and they are often seen together practicing athletics or pursuing dates.

Archie's other friends include Dilton Doiley, the local genius who gets Archie into and out of trouble through his experiments and inventions; Moose Mason, the dim-witted but likable star athlete of Riverdale High who is often Archie's teammate; Chuck Clayton, another of Archie's teammates who was originally shy and reclusive but came out of his shell when Archie befriended him; Moose and Chuck's girlfriends Midge Klump and Nancy Woods, two of the very few attractive girls Archie does not fall for; and Ethel Muggs, a girl with an enormous crush on Jughead, who often wins his heart with the use of fresh-baked cookies.

Interests

Sports
Outside of dating, Archie largely enjoys sports. He plays baseball, basketball, and football for the Riverdale High teams. Though often not as good an athlete as Moose Mason, Chuck Clayton or Reggie Mantle, he proves a valuable member of the school team. Coaches Kleats and Clayton value him for both his athletic abilities and his team spirit. However, Archie's athletic abilities vary from story to story, due to his frequent clumsiness. He also has a tendency to pay more attention to cheerleaders than to his playing. For this reason, Coach Kleats often tries to avoid resorting to use Archie in a game.

Cars

Automobiles are one of Archie's hobbies, and he is passionate about his car. For decades, he was shown driving a 1916 Ford Model T jalopy called "Betsy". In Archie double digest No. 192, it is said to be a Model A. In a story during which Archie tried to have his jalopy insured, he described it as being a "Ford, Chevy, Plymouth, Pierce-Arrow, Packard, DeSoto, Hudson ..." explaining that his jalopy was "a collection of replacement parts from several junkyards", some of which dated back to 1926.

Archie's jalopy was destroyed permanently in issue No. 238 of Life With Archie, which was published in 1983.
In the newer comics, he drives a mid-1960s' Ford Mustang, which is more contemporary in appearance, but still unreliable and prone to breakdowns. Archie Digest 239, published in October 2007, included a new story in which the one and only Mr. Lodge owned an antique car that had a strong resemblance to Archie's jalopy. The story featured Archie's grandfather who, as a teenager, looked and dressed like Archie from the 1940s. It turned out that he owned the same jalopy that Mr. Lodge now owned.

The Archies

The Archies is a garage band containing Archie (vocals and rhythm guitar), Reggie (bass), Veronica (vocals and keyboards), Betty (vocals, lead guitar and percussion), and Jughead (drums). Archie founded the group himself. Although not as famous as Josie and the Pussycats, the band plays numerous gigs and has some notoriety.
In the Little Archies series, the band just starts to form, although Archie, Betty, Jughead, Reggie, and Veronica start to play different kind of songs.

Death
In April 2014, 72 years after the character's first appearance, Archie Comics announced that the adult Archie would die in the July 2014 issue (#36) of Life with Archie, while the teenage Archie would continue in the other Archie comic series titles. Archie dies when he is shot in the abdomen while saving his friend, Senator Kevin Keller. The story is written so as to terminate both storylines, without committing to which girl Archie married, and contains several flashbacks to the Little Archie days. The final issue (#37) is set one year after Archie's death. All his friends memorialize him, and Riverdale High School is officially renamed Archie Andrews High School in his honor. The story ends with Jughead, owner of Juggie's (formerly Pop's Chock'lit Shoppe), serving a sundae to three children who resemble Little Archie, Betty, and Veronica.

In other media

Radio

Montana's characters were heard on radio in the early 1940s. Archie Andrews began on the NBC Blue Network on May 31, 1943, switched to Mutual in 1944, and then continued on NBC radio from 1945 until September 5, 1953. The program's original announcer was Kenneth Banghart, later succeeded by Bob Shepard (during the 1947–48 season, when Swift and Company sponsored the program) and Dick Dudley. Archie was first played by Charles Mullen (1943–1944), Jack Grimes (1944) and Burt Boyar (1945), with Bob Hastings (1945–1953) as the title character during the NBC years. Jughead was portrayed by Hal Stone, Cameron Andrews and later by Arnold Stang. Stone later wrote about his radio career in his autobiography,  (Bygone Days Press, 2003). During the NBC run, Rosemary Rice portrayed Betty, Gloria Mann portrayed Veronica, Alice Yourman portrayed Archie's mother, Mary Andrews and Arthur "Art" Kohl was Archie's father, Fred Andrews.

Television
Riverdale 2017-

Animation

 Archie Andrews appeared in The Archie Show, a 1968 cartoon series produced by Filmation. He also appeared in the various spin-offs produced in the same format from 1969 through 1977: Archie's TV Funnies, The U.S. of Archie, and others. He was voiced by Dallas McKennon.
 Archie Andrews appeared in The New Archies, a 1987 re-imagining of Archie and the gang. Archie was portrayed as a pre-teen in junior high. He was voiced by J. Michael Roncetti.
 Archie Andrews appeared in Archie's Weird Mysteries, voiced by Andrew Rannells. This version is a reporter for the local school newspaper.

Live action
 In 1962, Desilu produced an unaired pilot with Frank Bank as Archie.
 In 1964, Screen Gems filmed a Harry Ackerman unaired pilot, with unknown actor John Simpson in the title role.
 In 1976, Archie, a pilot for a proposed sitcom aired on ABC with Dennis Bowen as Archie Andrews, Gordon Jump as Mr. Andrews, Audrey Landers as Betty, Hilary Thompson as Veronica, and Whit Bissell as Mr. Lodge.
 In 1978, The Archie Situation Comedy Musical Variety Show with the same cast as the 1976 pilot, appeared on ABC, which, like the previous pilot, was not picked up.
 Archie was portrayed by Christopher Rich in the 1990 television film (and subsequent comic book), Archie: To Riverdale and Back Again. In the film, he is depicted as a successful lawyer with a fiancé named Pam, poised to move out of Riverdale and into the big city. However, upon attending his fifteen-year high school reunion, his old feelings for both Veronica and Betty start to reemerge.
 Archie appears in Riverdale, a drama series for The CW with KJ Apa starring as the character. Brock Brown plays the young Archie in the series' fourth season episode "Chapter Seventy-Five: Lynchian" and in some flashbacks shown in the sixth season.

Film

Animation
 Archie Andrews appeared in The Archies in Jugman, voiced by Andrew Rannells. The film was released direct-to-video and takes place after Archie's Weird Mysteries.

Live action
 Archie will make a film adaptation appearance in The Archies on Netflix. He is portrayed by Agastya Nanda.

Games
Archie appears as a character in the mobile game Crossy Road.

References

External links
 Haverhill cartoonist Bob Montana

 Interview with Michael Silberkleit by Rik Offenberger
 Vanity Fair: "American Idol" by Jim Windolf" (December 20, 2006)
 Gallery of Archie covers #1–200
 Archie at Don Markstein's Toonopedia. Archived from the original on April 4, 2012.
 Archie as Pureheart the Powerful at Don Markstein's Toonopedia. Archived from the original on April 9, 2012.

Audio 
 Archie Andrews on Way Back When
 

Archie Andrews
Archie Comics characters
Animated human characters
Comics characters introduced in 1941
Male characters in animation
Male characters in comics
Male characters in television
NBC Blue Network radio programs
Mutual Broadcasting System programs
NBC radio programs
1943 radio programme debuts
1953 radio programme endings
American comedy radio programs
Radio programs based on comic strips
Teenage characters in comics
Teenage characters in television
Characters created by John L. Goldwater
Characters created by Bob Montana
Fictional singers
Fictional guitarists
Fictional Scottish people